The Mizpah Hotel is a historic hotel in Tonopah, Nevada, U.S. It is a member of Historic Hotels of America, the official program of the National Trust for Historic Preservation.

The Mizpah and the nearby Belvada Building, both five stories high, shared the title of tallest building in Nevada until 1927. The hotel was named after the Mizpah Mine and was the social hub of Tonopah. The hotel was pre-dated by the Mizpah Saloon, which opened in 1907, and was the first permanent structure in Tonopah. The hotel was financed by George Wingfield, George S. Nixon, Cal Brougher and Bob Govan and designed by George E. Holesworth of Reno, Nevada (other sources state that the architect was Morrill J.  Curtis). Brougher in particular was involved with the Belmont, Tonopah, Midway and Tonopah Mining Company and the Tonopah Divide Mining Company. Brougher owned the Tonopah Banking Corporation, which had an office in the lobby of the 1905 building, and was a director of the Bank of Italy in San Francisco.

The reinforced concrete hotel was faced with stone on the front and brick on the sides and rear. The neighboring three-story Brougher-Govan Block, with rooms on the upper floors, served as the first Mizpah and remains connected. Cast iron columns were used in the windows and fire escapes. The three and five story buildings are joined with a wood stairway crowned with a skylight. Steam heat was provided, along with the first elevator in Tonopah.

According to legend, Wyatt Earp kept the saloon, Jack Dempsey was a bouncer, and Howard Hughes married Jean Peters at the Mizpah.  But Wyatt Earp left Tonopah before the Mizpah was built, Hughes was married in Tonopah, but not at the Mizpah, and Dempsey asserted he was never a bouncer.  The hotel nevertheless features the Jack Dempsey Room and the Wyatt Earp Bar.

The hotel is said to house a ghost deemed the Lady in Red by hotel guests who have experienced her presence. Legend says that the Lady in Red is the ghost of a prostitute who was beaten and murdered on the fifth floor of the hotel by a jealous ex-boyfriend. Another widely accepted description of the events is that The Lady in Red had been caught cheating by her husband at the hotel after he had missed a train, who then proceeded to kill her in a jealous rage.  The Lady in Red haunting of the Mizpah was featured in season 5, episode 2 of Ghost Adventures on the Travel Channel.

The Mizpah changed hands several times through the years until Frank Scott of Las Vegas (who also built the Union Plaza Hotel) bought it in 1979. Scott updated the hotel with “all the modern conveniences,” acting as a bridge to the modern day, all the while preserving the antiquated romance that had first drawn him to the hotel. In all, the work took 2.5 years and cost almost $4 million.

The hotel had been shuttered since 1999, but in early 2011, the hotel was purchased by Fred and Nancy Cline of Cline Cellars, Sonoma, California, who renovated and reopened the building to the public in August 2011. The newly renovated hotel has 47 rooms, a bar, and two restaurants; The Pittman Cafe and the  Jack Dempsey Room. There are plans to renovate further rooms in the hotel annex and to add a small casino to the property.

See also
 Goldfield Hotel designed by Curtis and Holesworth

References

External links

 Mizpah Hotel

Hotels in Nevada
Tonopah, Nevada
Buildings and structures in Nye County, Nevada
Hotel buildings completed in 1905
Hotel buildings on the National Register of Historic Places in Nevada
National Register of Historic Places in Tonopah, Nevada
Reportedly haunted locations in Nevada
1905 establishments in Nevada
Historic Hotels of America